Juan Lombardi (August 21, 1965 – August 28, 2021) was a former Uruguayan footballer who played for clubs of Uruguay and Chile.

Teams
  Danubio 1984-1991
  Rentistas 1992-1993
  Provincial Osorno 1993-1995
  Deportes Melipilla 1995-1996

References

External links
 Juan Lombardi at playmakerstats.com (English version of ceroacero.es)

1965 births
2021 deaths
Uruguayan footballers
Uruguayan expatriate footballers
Danubio F.C. players
C.A. Rentistas players
Provincial Osorno footballers
Deportes Melipilla footballers
Chilean Primera División players
Expatriate footballers in Chile
Association football forwards